Battista Mombrini (born 10 January 1944 in Treviglio) is an Italian painter and sculptor.

Biography 
Son of Mario and Agnes Mombrini, after eleven years of middle and grammar school at the college of San Pietro Seveso, Mombrini devoted himself entirely to painting by attending the artistic environment of Milan, the Brera Academy, and various museums, galleries and exhibition of Milan, drawing inspiration from artists of the period (especially the teachers Aldo Fornoni, best known for his female nudes and crayon, and Paul Frosecchi). With the brothers Filippo and Giuseppe Villa,  he was among the founders of the Group Brera Academy in Milan which brings together young artists.

Mombrini opened his own studio in Treviglio via Sangalli, which is still active, its artistic production (started in 1964) focuses initially on the topics "training" of portraiture, nude and landscape and then moved progressively towards the end of the seventies, to a decidedly personal interpretation and processing of breakdowns in key neo-cubist figurative. In 1976 he presented this evolution of his painting in a group show dedicated to the Italian countryside with Caroline Yeats Brown in London (August to Beauchamps Gallery in Chelsea and in September at the John Sears Gallery in Piccadilly Circus); in 1977 in France, at the Galerie d 'orsel of Paris, and in November 1978 in Switzerland, at the Maison des arts in La Chaux-de-Fonds, with personal tribute to the emigrant in which sociological approaches to those issues which characterize the creations later. In 1986 he exhibited at the Galerie Boycott in Brussels, Belgium.

The eighties were marked by intense organizational activity in Treviglio, when he took part in the founding of the association Pro Loco Shop Center, but especially in 1978 to the design of the exhibition "Painters of Via Sangalli" which, gathering every year hundreds of artists in a folk festival as well as cultural, was briefly known as "the little Bagutta Treviglio". on September 21, 2013 after 25 years since the last time he wanted to recreate that  with 92 artists who exhibited their works.

Moment in his "maturity" Art is the historical exhibition in 1997 in Monte Carlo, in the principality of Monaco, at the Maison de l'Amérique Latine.

Just for the undoubted technical ability and the intense appeal to values and feelings ( whether now with romantic, mystical time ) contained in his works, he was commissioned to decorate a wall of the Memorial Irmã Dulce (Sister Dulce, a Brazilian nun known for her dedication to the poor of her country ) to celebrate the sixth anniversary of the disappearance and the start of the process of beatification. The fresco, of 60 square meters, was inaugurated March 12, 1998 in the church dedicated to St. Anthony of Padua in Salvador de Bahia, where Mombrini back a few months later for a short exposure ( 17 to 21 August ) of twenty of his works at the Solar do Unhão, the Museum of Modern Art in El Salvador, and again in August 1999 to build a second fresco, a Maternity hospital in the entrance hall from Children's Day ( Children's Hospital ) in Memorial Irmã Dulce. In March 2003, he was back in Brazil, but this time in caraa, common in the extreme south of the country with a majority Italian population (Treviglio in particular), together with the artist to decorate the apse Brazilian Ho Monteiro ( 80 square meters) of restored sanctuary of Nossa Senhora das Lagrimas, the patron saint of both the Brazilian city of Treviglio.

During these years he exhibited also abroad, as in Beijing in 2006, in Greece in 2007, in Moscow in 2008 at the GUM on Red Square. In that same year returns for the last time in Brazil and Salvador de Bahia to affrescarvi the apse of the sanctuary of the Blessed Dulce of the Poor, also known as Church of the Immaculate Conception.

In 2010 he took part in the Prize of Contemporary Art Archer - Island of S. Antioco and the Spoleto Prize 53 - Festival of the Two Worlds , both curated by art critic Vittorio Sgarbi, who, in November, it also presents the staff at the number of Treviglio  and, in 2011, selected for the Italian Pavilion (Lombardy region) of the 54th Venice Biennale, served from June to November at the Palazzo Te in Mantua.

In January 2013 he exhibited at the gallery Adagio of the French town of Thionville, near the border with Luxembourg, the warm welcome and success found here, prompted the organizers to plan within the year the construction of a new exhibition in the neighboring state.

On April 27, 2013 took part in the seventh edition of the Festival International Artistic Martesana at the Villa Castelbarco in Vaprio d'Adda

On November 12, 2013 is included in the list of participants at the 1st Biennial of Creativity, which was held at the Palexpo Exhibition in Verona 12 to 16 January 2014. The Biennale was inaugurated by Vittorio Sgarbi. At the award ceremony on 16 January stepped in as guest of honor Katia Ricciarelli.

In 2014, celebrating 50 years in business.

Exhibition 

Personal

1969 - Gallery Diamante - Milan 
1971 - Bergamo 
1971 - Milan 
1972 - Milan 
1973 - Mandello del Lario - Lecco 
1974 - Vicenza 
1974 - Picchiaie - Elba 
1975 - Gallery Artioli - Treviglio 
1976 - Gallery Courier - Pesaro 
1976 - Gallery Beauchamps e John Sears Gallery - London 
1976 - Maison des Arts - Paris 
1977 - Library room - Ciserano 
1977 - La Chaux-de-Fonds - Switzerland 
1978 - Gallery - Pegognaga 
1978 - Gallery - Caravaggio 
1979 - Gallery - Treviglio 
1979 - Cassa Rurale ed Artigiana - Treviglio 
1980 - Ars Gallery - Bergamo 
1980 - Cassa Rurale ed Artigiana - Treviglio 
1981 - Showroom - Fara Gera d'Adda 
1984 - Gallery - Treviglio 
1985 - Gallery - Florence 
1986 - Showroom - Mantua 
1986 - Galeria Boycott - Brussels 
1987 - art biennal - Bari 
1987 - Library room - Cassano d'Adda 
1989 - Castello Visconteo - Trezzo sull'Adda 
1990 - Pro Loco - Cassano d'Adda 
1992 - Ancient convent of Concesa - Trezzo sull'Adda 
1992 - Castle Trezzo - Trezzo sull'Adda 
1993 - Gallery - Inzago 
1995 - Centre Georges Pompidou - Paris 
1995 - Library room - Cassano d'Adda 
1996 - Villa Castelbarco - Vaprio d'Adda 
1996 - Villa Gina - Concesa, (Trezzo sull'Adda) 
1997 - Maison de l'Amérique Latine de Monaco - Principality of Monaco 
1998 - Museo Solar do Unhão - Salvador (Bahia) 
1998 - Obras Sociais Irmã Dulce - Salvador (Bahia) 
1999 - Obras Sociais Irmã Dulce - Salvador (Bahia) 
1999 - Gallery Sallambo - Paris 
2001 - Pro Loco - Cassano d'Adda 
2002 - Showroom - Treviglio 
2003 - Santuário de Nossa Senhora das Lágrimas - Caraá 
2005 - Auditorium - Ciserano 
2006 - Building Berva - Cassano d'Adda 
2007 - Greece 
2008 - Santuário da Bem-aventurada Dulce dos Pobres - Salvador (Bahia) 
2008 - Moscow 
2010 - Museum of Treviglio 
2013 - Thionville 

Collective

1964 - show young artists - Treviglio 
1968 - shows young European artists - Rome 
1969 - Group Brera - Cavalo Branco - Treviglio 
1969 - Lombard Artists - Rome 
1969 - Italian artists today - Rome 
1970 - Group Brera - Hotel Milão - Brunate 
1970 - Group Brera - Bergamo 
1974 - 4x4 Gallery Diamante - Milan 
1975 - International Art Centre - Milan 
1976 - Gallery - Caravaggio 
1977 - Lombard artistic center of Lazio - Treviglio 
1977 - Spring'77 - UNESCO - Paris 
1979 - The Antena - Bergamo 
1988 - Adro 
1988 - 100 artists and a poem - Milan 
1989 - The woman in the painting - Milan 
1990 - UNESCO - Paris 
1991 - Europe tomorrow - Geneva 
1992 - Motherhood in art - Cassano d'Adda 
1994 - Art for Telethon - Treviglio 
2006 - Expo - Beijing 
2010 - Archer Award - Island of S. Antioco 
2010 - Festival dei Due Mondi - Spoleto 
2011 - Biennale - Palazzo del Te - Mantua 
2013 - VII international art exhibition martesana - Villa Castelbarco - Vaprio d'Adda 
2014 - First Italian Biennale of Creativity - Verona

Note

Bibliography 
  Battista Mombrini - Logos (catalog of the exhibition held at the Visconti Castle of Trezzo, 11 to 25 October 1992),Trezzo sull'Adda, 1992. 
 Alessandra Jerse and Piero Confalonieri (ed.), Mombrini - Lights of the sun and colors of sounds (catalog of the exhibition held at the Maison de l'Amérique Latine de Monaco, Monte Carlo, August 27 - September 6, 1997 ), Trezzo sull'Adda, Bama, 1977. 
 Mombrini. Suspended time (review of the exhibition held in Treviglio, 12 May-2 June 2002), Treviglio, Municipality, 2002.
 Vittorio Sgarbi (ed.), "Mombrini", Vaprio d'Adda, Sep Bama, 2010.

1944 births
Living people
People from Treviglio
20th-century Italian painters
Italian male painters
21st-century Italian painters
Brera Academy alumni
20th-century Italian male artists
21st-century Italian male artists